Olufunke Oshonaike-Irabor, also known as Funke Oshonaike (born 28 October 1975) is a professional Nigeria table tennis player. She competed for Nigeria at the 2012 Summer Olympics.

Oshonaike started her playing career on a street called Akeju Street in Shomolu, Lagos, in the early 1980s while very young.

She was a spectacle each time she played because she was very small and used to amaze people with her skill at that early age.

She attended Community Primary School, now known as Ola-Olu Primary School, Agunbiade, Shomolu, Lagos. While in primary 4, she won a competition for the school and was honoured by the Headmaster of the school, Mr G.O. Taiwo, on the assembly ground in front of her schoolmates.

After her primary education, she proceeded to Igbobi Girls High School, Igbobi-Yaba; she left the school in SSS 1 to proceed with her education and professional career.

At the 2016 Summer Olympics in Rio de Janeiro, Oshonaike competed in the women's single division. In the preliminary round, she defeated Mariana Sahakian of Lebanon. In round 1, she was defeated by Adriana Diaz of Puerto Rico. She was the flagbearer for Nigeria during the Parade of Nations.

She competed in the women's singles at the 2020 Summer Olympics.

References

External links

 

Nigerian female table tennis players
Table tennis players at the 1996 Summer Olympics
Table tennis players at the 2000 Summer Olympics
Table tennis players at the 2004 Summer Olympics
Table tennis players at the 2008 Summer Olympics
Table tennis players at the 2012 Summer Olympics
Table tennis players at the 2016 Summer Olympics
Olympic table tennis players of Nigeria
1975 births
Living people
Sportspeople from Lagos
Yoruba sportswomen
African Games gold medalists for Nigeria
African Games medalists in table tennis
African Games silver medalists for Nigeria
African Games bronze medalists for Nigeria
Competitors at the 2007 All-Africa Games
Competitors at the 2011 All-Africa Games
Competitors at the 2015 African Games
Competitors at the 2019 African Games
Table tennis players at the 2020 Summer Olympics